Still Here is the first full-length album released by John Mark Nelson on 29 December 2011. The songs for this album were crafted when Nelson was 17 years of age.  The album was featured on the local radio stations of Minnesota. After this album, Nelson decided to stop his music career for a short time.

Track listing

References 

2011 albums
John Mark Nelson albums